The 2013 Cork Senior Football Championship was the 115th staging of the Cork Senior Football Championship since its establishment by the Cork County Board in 1887. The championship began on 19 March 2013 and ended on 13 October 2013.

Castlehaven entered the championship as the defending champions.

On 13 October 2013, Castlehaven won the championship following a 0-16 to 1-11 defeat of nemo Rangers in the final. This was their 5th championship title overall and their second title in succession.

Castlehaven's Brian Hurley was the championship's top scorer with 3-47.

Team changes

To Championship

Promoted from the Cork Premier Intermediate Football Championship
 St. Vincent's

From Championship

Relegated to the Cork Premier Intermediate Football Championship
 Na Piarsaigh

Results

Divisional section

Round 1

Round 2

Round 3

Relegation playoff

Round 4

Quarter-finals

Semi-finals

Final

Championship statistics

Top scorers

Top scorers overall

Top scorers in a single game

=Miscellaneous

 Castlehaven win back to back titles for the first time.

References

External link

 2013 Cork Senior Football Championship results

Cork Senior Football Championship